Ynys Gifftan is an island near the south east shore of Traeth Bach, the Dwyryd estuary near Portmeirion in Gwynedd, north Wales. The island has been uninhabited since the mid-1960s and the island's single cottage is in a state of disrepair.
It is one of 43 (unbridged) tidal islands which may be reached on foot from the mainland of Great Britain.

References

External links 

Talsarnau
Islands of Gwynedd
Islands of Snowdonia
Tidal islands of Wales